The Bishop of Riverina is the diocesan bishop of the Anglican Diocese of Riverina, Australia.

List of Bishops of Riverina
References

External links

 – official site

 
Lists of Anglican bishops and archbishops
Anglican bishops of Riverina